The Tauhei solar farm is a proposed photovoltaic power station in New Zealand. The farm will be constructed near Te Aroha in the Matamata-Piako District by UK-based Harmony Energy, and will generate 147MW when complete.

The project applied for fast-track consent under the Covid-19 Recovery (Fast-Track Consenting) Act 2020 in December 2021. The project would convert a dairy farm to sheep, and farming would continue alongside electricity generation. Consent was granted in September 2022. Construction is expected to begin in 2024, and be complete in 2025.

See also

 Solar power in New Zealand

References

Solar power in New Zealand
Proposed renewable energy power stations in New Zealand
Te Aroha